Siwinqani (Aymara siwinqa a kind of cactus, -ni a suffix, "the one with the siwinqa plant", also spelled Sevengani) is a  mountain in the Bolivian Andes. It is located in the Potosí Department, Chayanta Province, Ocurí Municipality. It lies northwest of Lluxita, northeast of the village of Ch'aki Mayu (Chaqui Mayu).

References 

Mountains of Potosí Department